The 2018 season was Ranheim Fotball's first season in the Eliteserien following their promotion. They finished the season in 7th position and reached the Fourth Round of the Norwegian Cup.

Squad

Out on loan

Transfers

In

Loans in

Out

Loans out

Competitions

Eliteserien

Results summary

Results by round

Results

Table

Norwegian Cup

Squad statistics

Appearances and goals

|-
|colspan="14"|Players away from Ranheim on loan:

|-
|colspan="14"|Players who appeared for Ranheim no longer at the club:

|}

Goal scorers

Clean sheets

Disciplinary record

References 

Ranheim Fotball seasons
Ranheim